Leokadia Makarska-Čermák or Lily Čermák (in Czech: Leokadia Čermáková), known in the US for painting US Senator Charles Schumer, New York City Mayors Rudy Giuliani and Michael Bloomberg, was born in Polanica-Zdrój, Poland. She received a merit-based full scholarship from the Ministry of Culture that allowed her to study the five-year program in interior design and wood technologies at the Technical University in Zvolen, Czechoslovakia (today in Slovakia). After graduation, Leokadia married Jiří Čermák and moved to Ostrov a town not far from Karlovy Vary. She worked in Karlovy Vary first as an interior and furniture designer and later, as a teacher at a technical high school.

Education
Leokadia Makarska-Čermák (as Leokadia Čermáková) received her Bachelor of Arts with Cum Laude honors from the Bernard M. Baruch College of the City University of New York in the United States, her master's degree from the Thomas G. Masaryk College of the Czech Technical University (CVUT) in Prague, and her master's degree in Architecture of Interiors and Furniture design from Technical University in Zvolen in former Czechoslovakia.

Career Beginnings
Since the early 1980s, Makarska-Čermák belonged to local fine art club and exhibited her art in Ostrov and Karlovy Vary. However, in 1995 she decided to concentrate on her art work full-time and left her teaching position.

It was in these years that Makarska-Čermák studied painting and drawing under the direction of professor Hana in Karlovy Vary (Czech Republic), professors Francesco Brunetti, Demetrio Casile and Nino Noce in Italy, and Jacek M. Rybczynski in Germany.

In October 1997, Makarska-Čermák had her first exhibit in the United States. It was hosted by the Polish Consulate General in New York.

Since 1998, Makarska-Čermák has been working at the Grand Prospect Hall as an in-house artist and curator, restoring paintings and interiors.

Honors
Cermak's list of honors includes presentation of portraits to such public figures as NYC Mayors Rudy Giuliani and Michael Bloomberg U.S. Senator Chuck Schumer, and Founder and Executive Director of CIAO Mary C. Sansone.

Critical Acclaim 
Professor Jacek Maria Rybczynski wrote in Mainz, Germany, in 1996 a critical analysis on Leokadia Makarska-Cermak's unique art:

The paintings of Makarska-Cermak provoke and invite a deeply individual interpretation and experience of the colorful world of Nature. [Her artwork] branch out in two streams: one emotive, the other documentary. [In] The emotive stream […] is best exemplified in the "flower portrait" series; here we meet with lifelong companions incorporated in fantastic flora-motifs. Makarska-Cermak's self-avowed fascination with nature's beauty is coated with a layer of symbolism: the flower as the mystical center conveys mystery and discloses at once a perplexing enigma and the logic of events...for the flower alludes to the passage of time, the cycle of birth and demise. In the documentary stream, the artist explores the classical approach to portrait rendition, aptly depicting the personalities and psyches of her posers."

Elinor Stecker-Orel, Editor to The New York Times wrote about Leokadia Makarska-Cermak's artwork on October 27, 1998:

"The viewer is immediately struck by the power of [Leokadia Makarska-Cermak's] work, power that is manifested in her bold colors and forceful brushstrokes. Remarkably, Makarska-Cermak is able to integrate this approach with subjects that ordinarily would be rendered with a more delicate hand. The result is work that is both emotional and sensitive.

The United States certainly is the beneficiary in having this talented artist on our shores."

On November 12, 1998 Rafal Olbinski, painter, graphic and designer noted that:

As a member of the faculty of the School of Visual Arts for over a decade, I have had the privilege to observe and evaluate hundreds of portfolios and I have been fortunate to encounter many very talented people.

Leokadia Makarska-Cermak is one such artist, who displays depth, consistency, maturity and focus. She eloquently integrates her remarkable sensitivity to the
subject in the portraits, capturing the personality and the spirit of the person.
In both the portraits as well as the floral compositions,

Ms. Cermak displays a strong technique, skill and boundless feminine intuition.
Her ambition, dedication and prolificness is the evident driving force in her work, which exemplifies and reveals rich and diverse artistic abilities."

Media coverage
Leokadia Makarska-Čermák's work has been featured in newspaper and magazine articles as well as in radio and television programs. Below is a list of media, the respective language, date, and name or article or program.
In September 2011, Leokadia's painting the Golden Angels over Lower Manhattan received coverage by New York's Daily News (New York), Nowy Dziennik, and US Polsat TV (WNYE).  She also presented her painting and her 9/11 story at the Sanctuary Still remembrance event held at the St. Ann and the Holy Trinity Church on September 11, 2011.
Print of one of Leokadia's paintings auctioned for 6,100 PLN (2,000 USD), which was the second highest sum at the 3rd Annual Charitable Ball of Klodzko County's Leaders on February 11, 2012.

Czech
Karlovarske Noviny (Czech Newspaper) “Malirka z Polska bude vystavovat sve obrazy v Americe,” Karlovarske Noviny, Karlovy Vary, the Czech Republic, June 14, 1997.

English
The Post Eagle (Polish-American Newspaper) March 2011 Article, European Artist Presents Portrait to New York City Mayor, The Post Eagle, 11-2009. Reich, David (1999). "A Profile of the Artist: Leokadia Makarska-Cermak". The Post Eagle Reich, David (1999-06-23). "Polish Artisan Helping Restore Brooklyn Landmark". The Post Eagle., The Art Business News (American magazine)Art Business News, Picture Gallery, Portrait of NYC Mayor Giuliani, February 1999. Art Business News, March 2009, Ralph J. Sansone Foundation

French
Art Passion (French Magazine) Art Passion Magazine, December 2008.

Polish
Radio Zet (Polish Radio),
TVP Wroclaw (Polish television) 1)Program "Weekend Z", 2)Program "Fakty",
US Polsat-WNYE (Polish-American television) *Program "Polish News",
Nowy Dziennik (Polish-American newspaper)

Chronicle of New York, Bloomberg in the Eyes of a Polish Artist, The Polish Daily News, New York, 2009-11-15.

Słabisz, Aleksandra, "From Poland, through Czechia, to New York," The Polish Daily News, New York, 2011-05-16.

References

External links
Collection of more than 30 articles about Leokadia Makarska-Cermak and her artwork
 "Artist Leokadia Makarska-Cermak recently created a portrait in honor of Mary C. Sansone" HighBeam Research
 Leokadia Makarska-Čermák official website
 Leokadia Makarska-Cermak's YouTube Channel with clips from various television programs.
 Fan page on Facebook 

Year of birth missing (living people)
Living people
People from Kłodzko County
Czechoslovak emigrants to the United States